Geal Charn (1,049 m) is a mountain in the Grampian Mountains of Scotland. It is situated in the Highlands, on the southern shore of Loch Laggan.

A large and sprawling mountain, its most notable feature is its fine and distinctive summit cone. The nearest settlement is Kinloch Laggan.

References

Mountains and hills of Highland (council area)
Marilyns of Scotland
Munros
One-thousanders of Scotland